Andreas Christofer Molinder (born February 23, 1987) is a Swedish ice hockey player. He is currently a free agent.

Molinder has played in the Swedish Hockey League for Modo HockeyLinköpings HC and Timrå IK.

References

External links

1987 births
Living people
Linköping HC players
Modo Hockey players
People from Sollefteå Municipality
Swedish ice hockey centres
Timrå IK players
Sportspeople from Västernorrland County